The 2020–21 season was the 117th season in the existence of Bayer 04 Leverkusen and the club's 42nd consecutive season in the top flight of German football. In addition to the domestic league, Bayer 04 Leverkusen also participated in this season's edition of the DFB-Pokal as well as the UEFA Europa League. The season covered the period from 11 August 2020 to 30 June 2021.

Players

First-team squad

Players out on loan

Transfers

In

Out

Pre-season and friendlies

Competitions

Overview

Bundesliga

League table

Results summary

Results by round

Matches
The league fixtures were announced on 7 August 2020.

DFB-Pokal

UEFA Europa League

Group stage

The group stage draw was held on 2 October 2020.

Knockout phase

Round of 32
The draw for the round of 32 was held on 14 December 2020.

Statistics

Appearances and goals

|-
! colspan=14 style=background:#dcdcdc; text-align:center| Goalkeepers

|-
! colspan=14 style=background:#dcdcdc; text-align:center| Defenders

|-
! colspan=14 style=background:#dcdcdc; text-align:center| Midfielders

|-
! colspan=14 style=background:#dcdcdc; text-align:center| Forwards

|-
! colspan=14 style=background:#dcdcdc; text-align:center| Players transferred out during the season

Goalscorers

Last updated: 22 May 2021

Notes

References

External links

Bayer 04 Leverkusen seasons
Bayer 04 Leverkusen
Bayer 04 Leverkusen